Tlacotepec de Mejía is a municipality located in the montane central zone in the State of Veracruz, about 40 km from state capital Xalapa. It has a surface of 90.48 km2. The name comes from the language Náhuatl, Tlaco-tepec; that means “In the hill of the sticks of wood".

Geographic limits

The municipality of  Tlacotepec de Mejía  is delimited to the north by Totutla, to the east by Puente Nacional and to the south by Comapa. It is watered by the rivers Atliyac and Paso de Ovejas that are tributaries of the river La Antigua

Agriculture

It produces principally maize, coffee and sugarcane.

Celebrations

In  Tlacotepec de Mejía , in November takes place the celebration in honor to San Martín Caballero, Patron of the town, and in December takes place the celebration in honor to Virgen de Guadalupe.

Weather

The weather in  Tlacotepec de Mejía  is cold and wet all year with rains in summer and autumn.

References

External links 

  Municipal Official webpage
  Municipal Official Information

Municipalities of Veracruz